Abdul-Latif Salifu (born 8 January 1990 in [Kumasi]) is a Ghanaian football player currently playing for Ghana Telecom Premier League side Liberty Professionals F.C.

Career
Salifu is one of the biggest talents from Liberty Professionals F.C., he scored 12 goals in 16 games in his first season and was a nominee for Player of the Year 2008.

International
Salifu presented the Ghana U-20 team in Egypt at the 2009 FIFA U-20 World Cup. He is also in the extended squad of the Ghana national football team and played in a local national game against Togo national football team.

References

1989 births
Living people
Ghanaian footballers
Ghana under-20 international footballers
Ghanaian expatriate footballers
Liberty Professionals F.C. players
Association football forwards

ja:アルハサン・アブドゥル・ナザ